Justin Hardy (born December 18, 1991) is a gridiron football wide receiver for the Ottawa Redblacks of the Canadian Football League (CFL). He was drafted by the Atlanta Falcons in the fourth round of the 2015 NFL Draft. He played college football at East Carolina. Hardy was the NCAA all time reception leader until his former teammate Zay Jones overtook his record during the 2016 season.

Early years
Hardy attended West Craven High School in Vanceboro, North Carolina. As a senior on the football team, he played quarterback after previously being a wide receiver. That season, he passed for 2,500 yards and had 35 passing touchdowns. Hardy also picked two additional letters as a shooting and point guard on the basketball floor and another in track as a high jumper (best of 6-4 or 1.93m).

College career
Hardy was redshirted as a freshman at East Carolina University in 2010, a season in which he walked on. After earning a scholarship in spring 2011, he started eight of 10 games in his redshirt freshman season in 2011, recording a school freshman record 64 receptions for 658 yards and six touchdowns. As a sophomore in 2012 Hardy was an All-Conference USA first-team selection after recording 88 receptions for 1,105 yards and 11 touchdowns. As a junior in 2013, Hardy was again first-team All-Conference USA after setting school records for receptions (114) and receiving yards (1,284) in a season. During the first game of his senior season in 2014, he set East Carolina's record for career receptions, passing Dwayne Harris' 268. On November 22, 2014, against Tulane, Hardy became the NCAA's all-time leading receptions leader, passing Ryan Broyles' 349. On December 8, 2014, Hardy was named the winner of that season's Burlsworth Trophy, awarded annually to the most outstanding player who began his college career as a walk-on. For the season, Hardy had 121 receptions for 1,494 yards and 10 touchdowns.

Hardy finished his collegiate career with 387 receptions for 4,541 yards and 35 touchdowns.

Statistics

Professional career

Atlanta Falcons
Hardy was selected by the Atlanta Falcons in the fourth round (107th overall) in the 2015 NFL Draft. In his rookie season, Hardy played in nine games, catching 21 passes for 194 yards. In Week 2 of the 2016 season, against the Oakland Raiders, Hardy scored his first career touchdown when he caught a deflected pass from Matt Ryan in the end zone. In the 2016 season, he had 21 receptions for 203 yards and four touchdowns. Hardy and the Falcons reached Super Bowl LI, where they faced the  New England Patriots. In the Super Bowl, Hardy had two kickoff returns for 17 total yards as the Falcons fell in a 34–28 overtime defeat. In the 2017 season, Hardy recorded 20 receptions for 221 yards and three touchdowns. On March 21, 2019, Hardy re-signed with the Falcons. During the 2019 season Hardy caught 19 passes for 195 yards.

Chicago Bears
On July 27, 2021, Hardy signed with the Chicago Bears. He was released on August 17, 2021.

Ottawa Redblacks 
On March 18, 2022 Hardy signed with the Ottawa Redblacks of the Canadian Football League (CFL).

References

External links

East Carolina Pirates bio
Atlanta Falcons bio

1991 births
Living people
American football wide receivers
Atlanta Falcons players
Chicago Bears players
East Carolina Pirates football players
People from Craven County, North Carolina
Players of American football from North Carolina
Ottawa Redblacks players
Canadian football wide receivers